This is a list of foreign players in Allsvenskan, which commenced play in 1924. The following players must meet both of the following two criteria:
have played at least one Allsvenskan game. Players who were signed by Allsvenskan clubs, but only played in lower league, cup and/or European games, or did not play in any competitive games at all, are not included.
are considered foreign, determined by the following:
A player is considered foreign if he is not eligible to play for Sweden national football team.

Ronald Powell, who played for Brynäs IF in the 1974 season, was the first foreign player in Allsvenskan.

In bold: players who have played at least one Allsvenskan game in the most recent season (2021 Allsvenskan), and are still at the clubs for which they have played. This does not include current players of an Allsvenskan club who have not played an Allsvenskan game in the current season.

List of players

Afghanistan
Sharif Mukhammad – AFC Eskilstuna – 2017
Farshad Noor – AFC Eskilstuna – 2017

Albania

Albion Ademi – Djurgården – 2021–
Astrit Ajdarević – Örebro, Norrköping, Helsingborg, Djurgården – 2010–2012, 2015–2016, 2019–2020
Jasir Asani – AIK – 2020
Etrit Berisha – Kalmar – 2008–2013
Egzon Binaku – BK Häcken, Malmö FF, Norrköping – 2015–
Agon Mehmeti – Malmö FF, Örebro – 2008–2011, 2014–2015, 2019–2021
Migen Memelli – GAIS – 2007–2008
Valdet Rama – Örebro – 2011–2012

Algeria
Samir Beloufa – Helsingborg – 2007
Dalil Benyahia – Brommapojkarna – 2009–2010

Angola
Yamba Asha – Öster – 2006
Paulo Figueiredo – Öster – 2006
Dominique Kivuvu – Mjällby – 2012

Argentina

Martín Crossa – IFK Göteborg – 2003
Gabriel Ferreyra – AIK – 2014
Franco Miranda – Helsingborg – 2006–2007
Pablo Monsalvo – AIK – 2007
Iván Obolo – AIK – 2007–2009
Jorge Ortiz – AIK – 2008–2010
Luis Antonio Rodríguez – Djurgården – 2010
José Shaffer – IFK Göteborg – 2006
Luis Solignac – Djurgården – 2013
Nicolás Stefanelli – AIK – 2017–2018, 2021–2022
Lucas Valdemarín – AIK – 2007–2008

Armenia
André Calisir – Djurgården, Jönköpings Södra, IFK Göteborg – 2010–2011, 2016–2020
Yura Movsisyan – Djurgården – 2018
Levon Pachajyan – GAIS – 2008

Australia
Nic Bosevski – Norrköping – 2002
Luke Casserly – AIK – 2000–2002
Ante Čović – Hammarby, Elfsborg – 2002–2006, 2009–2011
Scott Jamieson – IFK Göteborg – 2016–2017
Peter Makrillos – GIF Sundsvall – 2022–
Nik Mrdja – AIK – 2004
Joseph Spiteri – Norrköping – 2001

Austria
Roman Kienast – Helsingborg – 2008
Michael Langer – Norrköping – 2016–2017
Thomas Piermayr – AFC Eskilstuna – 2017

Azerbaijan
Emin Nouri – Öster, Kalmar  – 2006, 2008–2021
Anatoli Ponomarev – Kalmar, GAIS – 2005, 2007
Igor Ponomaryov – Norrköping – 1989

Belarus
Sergei Aleinikov – Oddevold – 1996
Artsyom Rakhmanaw – AFC Eskilstuna – 2019
Dzyanis Sashcheka – Halmstad – 2005
Pilip Vaitsiakhovich – Värnamo – 2022–

Belgium
Bernard Beuken – Malmö FF – 1996
Yanis Mbombo – Örebro – 2017
Stefan Van Riel – Trelleborg – 1998

Benin
Yosif Ayuba – Djurgården – 2009–2010
Razak Omotoyossi – Helsingborg, GAIS, Syrianska – 2007–2008, 2011

Bosnia and Herzegovina

Admir Aganović – Syrianska – 2012
Anel Ahmedhodžić – Malmö FF – 2019–2021
Almir Buhić – Örebro – 1996
Ismet Crnalić – Brage – 1986
Ranko Đorđić – Norrköping – 1985–1988
Dennis Hadžikadunić – Malmö FF, Trelleborg – 2016–2018, 2022–
Nedim Halilović – Örebro – 2007–2008
Irfan Jašarević – Dalkurd – 2018
Nikola Jokišić – Norrköping, Häcken – 1994
Dragan Kapčević – Gefle, Sirius – 2010–2011, 2017
Aleksandar Kitić – Ljungskile – 2008
Sulejman Krpić – AIK – 2017
Darko Mavrak – Djurgården, Norrköping – 1995–1997
Enes Muhić – Öster – 1992
Adi Nalić – AFC Eskilstuna, Malmö FF – 2019–
Nebojša Novaković – Djurgården, AIK – 1995–2001
Haris Radetinac – Åtvidaberg, Mjällby, Djurgården – 2010, 2012–
Radoslav Radulović – Enköping – 2003
Ivan Ristić – Syrianska – 2011
Amir Teljigović – Trelleborg – 1997–1998

Bolivia
Martin Smedberg-Dalence – IFK Göteborg, Ljungskile, IFK Norrköping –  2005, 2008, 2011–2017

Brazil

Aílton – Örgryte – 2004–2006
Alessandro Pereira – Örgryte, Syrianska, AIK – 2009, 2011–2013, 2015
Alex – Hammarby – 2016
Afonso Alves – Örgryte, Malmö FF – 2002–2003, 2004–2006
Dedé Anderson – Hammarby, Kalmar – 2003–2005
Anselmo – Halmstad – 2008–2010
Ari – Kalmar – 2006–2007
Lourival Assis – Kalmar – 2009
Fábio Augusto – Kalmar – 2004–2007
Daniel Bamberg – Norrköping, Örebro – 2008, 2012
Berger – Enköping – 2003
Bernardo Vilar – IFK Göteborg, Värnamo – 2021–
Neto Borges – Hammarby – 2018
Bosco – Örgryte – 2003
Pablo Campos – GAIS – 2008
Leandro Castán – Helsingborg – 2007
Cláudio – Hammarby – 2009
Clécio – AIK – 2010
Ricardo Costa – Örebro – 2003–2004
Eduardo Delani – Halmstad – 2005
Denilson – Helsingborg – 2008
Diego Fumaça – Helsingborg – 2022–
Diogo – Kalmar – 2004
Eduardo – Örebro – 2003
Eliton Junior – Varberg – 2022–
Elvis – Hammarby – 2003
Enrico – Djurgården – 2006–2008
Erick Brendon – Värnamo – 2022–
Fabio – Örebro – 2018, 2020
Jael Ferreira – Kalmar – 2010
Wílton Figueiredo – AIK, Malmö FF – 2006–2007, 2009–2012
Antônio Flávio – AIK – 2009–2010
Bruno Fogaça – Elfsborg – 2001
Gabriel – Malmö FF – 2006–2009
Willian Gerlem – Syrianska – 2013
Givaldo – Kalmar – 2007
Paulinho Guará – Örgryte, Hammarby, Örebro – 2002–2008, 2010–2011
Odair Hellman – Enköping – 2003
Pedro Henrique – Kalmar – 2011
Hiago – Kalmar – 2018
Ismael – Kalmar – 2013–2017
Jajá – Kalmar – 2018
Jean – Hammarby, Varbergs, Norrköping – 2019–
Júnior – Malmö FF – 2006–2007
Kayke – Häcken – 2010–2011
Igor Santos Koppe – Syrianska – 2013
Vinícius Lopes – Häcken – 2008–2010
Gabriel Machado – Syrianska – 2013
Rafael Magalhães – Hammarby – 2009
Maxwell – Kalmar – 2019
Maranhão – Häcken – 2011
Marinho – Hammarby – 2004
Bruno Marinho – Åtvidaberg – 2010, 2012, 2014–2015
Alysson Marins – Kalmar – 2002
Gustavo Martins – Landskrona – 2002
Matâo – GAIS – 2008
Thiago Matos – Kalmar – 2006
Caio Mendes – Norrköping – 2011
Daniel Mendes – AIK, Kalmar – 2006–2013
Daniel Morais – GAIS – 2008–2009
Adriano Munoz – Örebro – 2009
Netinho – Värnamo – 2022–
Nixon – Kalmar – 2018
Thiago Oliveira – Kalmar – 2007
Pablo Dyego – Djurgården – 2013
Patrick Luan – Örebro – 2021
Paulinho – Häcken, Örebro, Hammarby – 2007–2011, 2015–2021
Piracaia – AIK – 1997–1998
Michel Pires – Sundsvall – 2012
Rafael Porcellis – Helsingborg – 2009–2010
Thiago Quirino – Djurgården – 2006–2008
Rafinha – Kalmar – 2019–2020
Reinaldo – Helsingborg – 2002
Claudinei Resende – Helsingborg – 2004
Ricardinho – Malmö FF – 2009–2014
Robério – Örgryte – 2004
João Rodrigo – Öster – 2003
Leandro Rodrigues – Kalmar – 2009
Romarinho – GAIS, Kalmar – 2009–
Rômulo – Hammarby – 2016–2017
Marcelo Sá – Örgryte – 2004
Marcel Sacramento – Kalmar – 2008, 2010
César Santin – Kalmar – 2004–2008
Álvaro Santos – Helsingborg, Örgryte, GAIS – 2000–2003, 2009, 2011–2014
Bruno Santos – Norrköping – 2011
Ricardo Santos – Kalmar, Djurgården, Åtvidaberg – 2007, 2009–2014
Márcio Saraiva – AIK – 2006
Álberis da Silva – Åtvidaberg – 2010, 2012–2015
Reinaldo da Silva – Kalmar – 2009
Ricardo Friedrich – Kalmar – 2022–
Rogério Silva – Helsingborg – 2001
Daniel Sobralense – Kalmar, IFK Göteborg, Örebro – 2008–2014
Thiago – Trelleborg – 2011
Tiago – Helsingborg – 2003
Valter Tomaz Júnior – Örgryte – 1998–2006
Bruno Tonheta – Landskrona – 2002
Douglas Vieira – Kalmar – 2010
Wánderson Cavalcante Melo – AFC Eskilstuna – 2017
Wánderson – GAIS, Helsingborg – 2007–2012, 2019
Wenderson – Värnamo – 2022–

Bulgaria
Mihail Ivanov – AFC Eskilstuna – 2019
Plamen Nikolov – Brage – 1986
Emil Spassov – Brage – 1986

Burkina Faso
Ibrahim Bancé – Helsingborg – 2019
Adama Guira – Djurgården – 2011

Burundi
Marco Weymans – Östersund – 2019–2021

Cameroon

Eric Ayuk – Jönköping – 2017
Eric Bassombeng – Örebro, GAIS – 2008–2012
Joseph Elanga – Malmö FF – 2000–2005, 2010
Patrice Kwedi – IFK Göteborg – 2004
Matthew Mbuta – Syrianska – 2012
Joseph Nguijol – Gefle – 2005
Alain Junior Ollé Ollé – Åtvidaberg – 2012
Bertin Samuel Zé Ndille – Örebro – 2008–2010

Canada

Sam Adekugbe – IFK Göteborg – 2017
Stephen Ademolu – Trelleborg – 2004
Fernando Aguiar – Landskrona – 2004
Wyn Belotte – Norrköping – 2002
Nikola Budalić – Örebro – 2003
Tomer Chencinski – Örebro, Helsingborg – 2012, 2016
Nick Dasovic – Trelleborg – 1996
Ali Gerba – GIF Sundsvall, IFK Göteborg – 2005–2007
Atiba Hutchinson – Öster, Helsingborg – 2003–2005
Chris Pozniak – Örebro – 2001–2003
Kenny Stamatopoulos – Enköping, AIK – 2003, 2010–2015, 2017
Jonathan Viscosi – Sirius – 2020
Mark Watson – Öster – 1997–1998

Cape Verde
Mateus Lopes – Assyriska – 2005
Sixten Mohlin – Dalkurd, Östersund – 2018–2019, 2021

Chad
Azrack Mahamat – Halmstad – 2009

Chile

Miiko Albornoz – Brommapojkarna, Malmö FF – 2009–2014
Marko Biskupović – Kalmar – 2016–2017
Juan Robledo – Mjällby, Öster – 2010, 2012–2013

Comoros
Fouad Bachirou – Östersund, Malmö – 2016–2020

Congo
Noel Mbo – Helsingborg – 2019–2020
Ravy Tsouka – Helsingborg – 2020, 2022

Costa Rica

Celso Borges – AIK – 2012–2014
Diego Calvo – IFK Göteborg – 2014
Diego Campos – Degerfors – 2022–
Mayron George – Kalmar – 2020
Jonathan McDonald – Kalmar – 2012–2013
Christopher Meneses – Norrköping – 2013–2015
Roy Miller – Örgryte – 2009
Ian Smith – Norrköping – 2018–2019

Croatia

Filip Ambrož – IFK Göteborg – 2021–
Antonio Čolak – Malmö FF – 2021
Ivica Cvitkušić – Djurgården – 1992
Josip Filipović – Mjällby – 2021–
Mario Jelavić – Åtvidaberg – 2015
Goran Ljubojević – AIK – 2010
Hrvoje Milić – Djurgården – 2009–2010
Mario Musa – Hammarby – 2017
Mate Šestan – Hammarby – 1999
Nikola Tkalčić – Norrköping – 2011–2017
Ivan Turina – AIK – 2010–2013
Stipe Vrdoljak – AIK – 2017

Curaçao
Anthony van den Hurk – Helsingborg – 2020, 2022

Czech Republic
Matěj Chaluš – Malmö FF – 2022–
Martin Hyský – AIK – 1996
Dušan Melichárek – Malmö FF – 2008–2009, 2011, 2019
Pavel Zavadil – Öster, Örgryte – 2006, 2009

Denmark

Nicolaj Agger – Djurgården – 2011
Mads Albæk – IFK Göteborg – 2015–2017
Bo Braastrup Andersen – Djurgården – 1999
Søren Andersen – Norrköping – 1995
Jakob Ankersen – IFK Göteborg – 2015–2016
Jeppe Andersen – Hammarby – 2017–2022
Morten Avnskjold – Landskrona – 2005
Christian Bank – Malmö FF – 1999
Jesper Bech – Malmö FF – 2005–2006
Mikkel Beckmann – Elfsborg – 2013–2014
David Boysen – Elfsborg, Helsingborg – 2018–2019
Kim Christensen – IFK Göteborg – 2008–2010
Martin Christensen – Åtvidaberg, Helsingborg  – 2012–2016
Anders Christiansen – Malmö FF – 2016–
Jesper Christiansen – Elfsborg – 2010–2011
Peter Christiansen – Helsingborg – 2005–2006
Finn Donnerborg – Åtvidaberg – 1978–1979
Knud Engedahl – Västerås – 1978
Mads Fenger – Hammarby – 2017–
Peter Graulund – Helsingborg – 2004–2005
Jesper Håkansson – Djurgården – 2005
Jakob Haugaard – AIK – 2020
Frederik Helstrup – Helsingborg – 2015–2016
Nichlas Hindsberg – Hammarby – 2005
Frederik Holst – Elfsborg – 2018–2021
Kasper Jensen – Djurgården – 2012
Mikkel Jensen – Hammarby, Brommapojkarna – 2003–2010
Thomas Juel-Nielsen – Falkenberg – 2016
Jonas Knudsen – Malmö FF – 2019–
Johnny Kongsbøg – Landskrona – 1994
Allan Kuhn – Örgryte – 1997–2000
Jesper Lange – Helsingborg – 2016
Kasper Larsen – Norrköping – 2018–2019
Lars Larsen – Örebro – 2003–2004, 2007
Søren Larsen – Djurgården – 2004–2005
Rasmus Lauritsen – Norrköping – 2019–2020
Anders Lindegaard – Helsingborg – 2019–2020, 2022
Kristoffer Lund – Häcken – 2021–
Marco Lund – Norrköping – 2021–
Thomas Madsen – Örgryte – 1993
Marcus Mathisen – Halmstad, Falkenberg, Sirius – 2017, 2019–
Thomas Mikkelsen – IFK Göteborg – 2015
Tobias Mikkelsen – Helsingborg – 2019
Brian Steen Nielsen – Malmö FF – 2001–2002
Lasse Nielsen – Malmö FF – 2017–
Lasse Nielsen – Trelleborg – 2018
Ole Nielsen – Västerås – 1978
Peter Nymann – Djurgården – 2012–2013
Jeppe Okkels – Elfsborg – 2020–
Allan Olesen – Åtvidaberg – 2012–2014
Kim Olsen – Örebro – 2008–2010
David Ousted – Hammarby – 2020–2021
Bjørn Paulsen – Hammarby – 2017–2018, 2021–2022
Marc Pedersen – Djurgården – 2012–2013
Flemming Pehrson – Mjällby – 1980, 1985
Ronny Petersen – Trelleborg – 2001
Anders Randrup – Elfsborg, Helsingborg – 2016–2017, 2019–2020
Kenneth Rasmussen – Helsingborg – 2002–2004
Martin Rauschenberg – Gefle, Brommapojkarna – 2015–2016, 2018
Allan Ravn – Landskrona – 2003
Phillip Rejnhold – Helsingborg – 2022–
Mads Roerslev – Halmstad – 2017
André Rømer – Elfsborg – 2021–
Søren Rieks – IFK Göteborg, Malmö FF – 2014–
Mikkel Rygaard Jensen – Häcken – 2022–
Per Sefort – Landskrona – 1994
Olcay Senoglu – Trelleborg – 2007–2008
Andreas Skovgaard – Örebro – 2020–2021
Martin Spelmann – Mjällby – 2020
Kevin Stuhr Ellegaard – Elfsborg – 2012–2019
Harald Sørensen – Häcken – 1983
Sebastian Svärd – Syrianska – 2013
Stig Tøfting – Häcken – 2005
Viktor Tranberg – Örebro – 2018
Christian Traoré – Hammarby – 2002, 2007–2009
Jeppe Vestergaard – Malmö FF – 2002–2003
Lasse Vibe – IFK Göteborg – 2013–2015, 2019
Ulrich Vinzents – Malmö FF – 2006–2012
Magnus Wørts – Mjällby – 2021–2022
Kenneth Zohore – IFK Göteborg – 2014

DR Congo

Yannick Bapupa – Djurgården, Gefle – 2002–2004, 2006–2009
Richard Ekunde – GAIS – 2006–2012
René Makondele – Djurgården, Gefle, Helsingborg, Häcken – 2002–2016
Nzuzi Toko – IFK Göteborg – 2019–2020

Egypt
Faithem Abolew – Helsingborg – 1997
Alexander Jakobsen – Falkenberg, Norrköping, Kalmar  – 2015–2019

England

John Allen – Malmö FF, V. Frölunda – 1989
Ken Allen – Halmstad – 1983
Hakeem Araba – Falkenberg – 2015–2016
Calum Angus – GAIS – 2009–2012
Dave Bamber – Trelleborg – 1985
Eddie Blackburn – Halmstad – 1987
Jamal Blackman – Östersund – 2016
Lee Boylan – Trelleborg – 1999
Shaun Close – Halmstad – 1986
Charlie Colkett – Östersund – 2019–2021
Terry Curran – Åtvidaberg – 1980
Alan Dodd – GAIS – 1988
Curtis Edwards – Östersund, Djurgården – 2016–2021
Justin Fashanu – Trelleborg – 1993
Andrew Fox – AFC Eskilstuna – 2017
Steve Galloway – Djurgården, Umeå – 1988–1989, 1996
Steve Gardner – IFK Göteborg, GAIS – 1983–1984, 1988
Stuart Garnham – Djurgården – 1981
Colin Hill – Trelleborg – 1997
Jamie Hopcutt – Östersund – 2016–2019
Brian Hornsby – Brage – 1984–1985
Graham Howell – Västerås – 1978
Simon Hunt – Elfsborg, Brage – 1984, 1986–1987
Francis Jno-Baptiste – Östersund – 2019–2021
James Keene – GAIS, Elfsborg, Djurgården, Halmstad – 2006–2013, 2015
Andrew Kelly – Landskrona – 2005
Billy Lansdowne – Kalmar – 1984–1986
Gary Locke – Halmstad – 1986
Brian McDermott – Norrköping, Djurgården – 1984, 1986
Malcolm Macdonald – Djurgården – 1979
Paul McKinnon – Malmö FF – 1980–1981
Trevor Mathewson – Örgryte – 1988
Jernade Meade – AFC Eskilstuna – 2017
Andrew Mills – Östersund – 2020
David Mogg – Åtvidaberg – 1981
Ravel Morrison – Östersund – 2019
Mike Newson – Öster – 1995
Gary Owen – Hammarby – 1988
Tim Parkin – Malmö FF – 1980–1981
George Parris – Norrköping – 1995
Kyle Patterson – GAIS – 2010
Kenny Pavey – AIK, Öster – 2006–2011, 2013–2015
Ronald Powell – Brynäs – 1974
Alex Purver – Östersund – 2019–2020
Lloyd Saxton – GIF Sundsvall – 2015, 2019
Jerell Sellars – Östersund – 2018–2021
Teddy Sheringham – Djurgården – 1985
Carl Shutt – Malmö FF – 1990
Mike Small – Häcken – 1994
Alfie Whiteman – Degerfors – 2021–2022
Steve Whitton – Halmstad – 1990
John Wilkinson – AIK – 1978–1979
Gary Williams – Djurgården – 1978–1980, 1986
David Wilson – Ljungskile – 1997
Frank Worthington – Mjällby – 1980

Eritrea
Henok Goitom – AIK – 2012–2015, 2017–2021
Mohammed Saeid – Örebro, Sirius – 2012–2014, 2018–2021

Estonia

Henri Anier – Kalmar – 2016
Vitali Gussev – Trelleborg – 2004
Marko Kristal – Elfsborg – 1999
Siim Luts – Norrköping – 2013
Karol Mets – AIK – 2019–2020
Tarmo Neemelo – Helsingborg – 2006
Erik Sorga – IFK Göteborg – 2022
Joonas Tamm – Norrköping – 2011–2013
Ingemar Teever – Öster – 2006
Andreas Vaikla – Norrköping – 2016
Kristen Viikmäe – Gefle – 2006
Indrek Zelinski – Landskrona – 2003

Ethiopia
Walid Atta – AIK, Helsingborg, Häcken, Östersund – 2008–2010, 2012–2014, 2016
Yussuf Saleh – AIK, Syrianska – 2008–2009, 2011–2012

Faroe Islands
Viljormur Davidsen – Helsingborg – 2022
Brandur Hendriksson – Helsingborg – 2020

Finland

Denis Abdulahi – Örebro – 2010–2011
Pertti Alaja – Malmö FF – 1982–1983
Jarmo Alatensiö – Brage – 1988–1989
Nikolai Alho – Halmstad – 2017–
Paulus Arajuuri – Kalmar – 2010–2013
Kari Arkivuo – Häcken – 2010–2019
Magnus Bahne – Halmstad – 2007–2009
Anders Eriksson – Öster – 1996–1997
Carljohan Eriksson – Mjällby – 2020–2021
Jari Europaeus – Gefle, Öster – 1984, 1987–1988
Petteri Forsell – Örebro – 2017
Mikael Granskog – Norrköping – 1981–1982, 1984–1986
Albin Granlund – Örebro – 2018–2020
Tommi Grönlund – Ljungskile, Trelleborg, Helsingborg – 1997–2003
Markus Halsti – Malmö FF – 2008–2014
Kasper Hämäläinen – Djurgården – 2010–2012
Janne Hietanen – Norrköping – 1998
Erik Holmgren – GAIS – 1988–1992
Hampus Holmgren – Åtvidaberg – 2015
Jari Hudd – AIK – 1987–1989
Jukka Ikäläinen – Örgryte – 1981–1985
Jari Ilola – Elfsborg – 2003–2010
Jonatan Johansson – Malmö FF – 2006–2008
Miika Juntunen – Örgryte – 1986
Tom Källström – AIK – 1976–1978
Rasmus Karjalainen – Örebro, Helsingborg – 2020, 2022
Christoffer Kloo – Öster – 1996–1998
Ulf Kortesniemi – Ljungskile – 1997
Sampo Koskinen – IFK Göteborg – 2003
Mika Kottila – Trelleborg – 2000–2001
Toni Kuivasto – Djurgården – 2003–2009
Pekka Kultanen – IFK Sundsvall – 1979
Peter Lindholm – IFK Sundsvall – 1981
Stefan Lindström – IFK Sundsvall – 1981
Lucas Lingman – Helsingborg – 2022
Jari Litmanen – Malmö FF – 2005–2006
Ismo Lius – Örgryte – 1990
Jani Lyyski – Djurgården – 2010–2011
Tomi Maanoja – AIK – 2008–2010
Eero Markkanen – AIK, Dalkurd – 2014, 2016–2018
Pauli Matikainen – Brynäs – 1974
Lasse Mattila – Ljungskile – 1997
Pekka Mattila – GIF Sundsvall – 1989
Niklas Moisander – Malmö FF – 2021–
Jyrki Nieminen – AIK – 1979, 1981–1984
Jari Niinimäki – AIK – 1986
Fredrik Nordback – Örebro – 1997–2004, 2007–2011
Thomas Nordström – Örebro – 1990
Jussi Nuorela – Malmö FF – 2002–2003
Mika Nurmela – Malmö FF – 1993–1995
Janne Oinas – Örebro – 1995
Juhani Ojala – Häcken – 2017–2019
Mika Ojala – Häcken – 2013
Antti Okkonen – Landskrona – 2004–2005
Hannu Patronen – Helsingborg – 2008–2011
Esa Pekonen – AIK – 1987–1989
Akseli Pelvas – Falkemberg – 2016
Joel Perovuo – Djurgården – 2010–2011
Erkka Petäjä – Öster, Malmö FF – 1985–1988, 1990–1993
Juho Pirttijoki – Sundsvall – 2017–2018
Antti Pohja – Hammarby – 2002–2003
Roni Porokara – Örebro – 2008–2010
Jens Portin – Gefle – 2010–2016
Jari Poutiainen – Hammarby – 1990
Jari Rantanen – IFK Göteborg – 1986–1987
Rami Rantanen – Trelleborg – 1995–1997
Aki Riihilahti – Djurgården – 2007–2008
Patrik Rikama-Hinnenberg – GIF Sundsvall – 2012
Riku Riski – Örebro, IFK Göteborg – 2011, 2015
Paulus Roiha – Åtvidaberg – 2010
Anders Roth – Örgryte – 1987–1990
Janne Saarinen – IFK Göteborg, Häcken – 1997, 2009
Jarmo Saastamoinen – AIK – 1995
Mika Sankala – GIF Sundsvall – 1987–1989
Jani Sarajärvi – Norrköping – 2002
Jukka Sauso – Örgryte – 2005–2006
Henri Scheweleff – Örgryte – 2005–2006
Rasmus Schüller – Häcken, Djurgården – 2016, 2021–
Henri Sillanpää – GAIS – 2010–2012
Daniel Sjölund – Djurgården, Åtvidaberg, Norrköping – 2003–2018
Simon Skrabb – Åtvidaberg, Gefle, Norrköping, Kalmar – 2014–2019, 2022–
Tim Sparv – Halmstad – 2007–2009
Antti Sumiala – Norrköping – 2002
Kim Suominen – Norrköping – 1996–1997
Fredrik Svanbäck – Helsingborg – 2004–2009
Robert Taylor – AIK – 2017
Robin Tihi – AIK, Värnamo – 2020, 2022–
Joona Toivio – Djurgården, Häcken – 2010–2012, 2018–2021
Markus Törnvall – Norrköping – 1989
Marko Tuomela – GIF Sundsvall – 2001–2002
Jasse Tuominen – Häcken – 2020–2021
Tuomo Turunen – IFK Göteborg, Trelleborg – 2009–2011
Jere Uronen – Helsingborg – 2012–2015
Pekka Utriainen – Holmsund – 1967
Peter Utriainen – Öster, Gefle – 1980–1984
Tuomas Uusimäki – Häcken, Örgryte – 2001, 2005–2006
Leo Väisänen – Elfsborg – 2020–2022
Sauli Väisänen – AIK – 2014–2017
Vesa Vasara – Kalmar – 2002
Isak Vidjeskog – Kalmar – 2021–
Walter Viitala – Malmö FF – 2018
Kari Virtanen – AIK – 1983–1985
Ville Viljanen – Häcken, V. Frölunda – 1998–1999
Robin Wikman – Landskrona, Häcken – 2005, 2009
Tommy Wirtanen – Örebro – 2009–2012
Saku Ylätupa – AIK, GIF Sundsvall – 2019–

France
Bobby Allain – Örebro – 2021
Grégoire Amiot – Falkenberg – 2020
Ibrahim Ba – Djurgården – 2005
Younes Bnou Marzouk – Dalkurd FF – 2018
Mamadou Fofana – Syrianska – 2011
Léandre Griffit – Elfsborg – 2006–2007
Joshua Nadeau – Gefle – 2016
Damien Plessis – Örebro – 2017–
Mahamé Siby – Malmö FF – 2022–
Arthur Sorin – Kalmar – 2007–2008

Gabon
Serge-Junior Martinsson Ngouali – Brommapojkarna, Hammarby – 2010, 2013–2014, 2017–2020

Gambia

Modou Barrow – Norrköping – 2012
Kebba Ceesay – Djurgården, Dalkurd, Sirius, Helsingborg – 2007–2012, 2016, 2018–2020
Omar Colley – Djurgården – 2015–2016
Pa Dibba – GIF Sundsvall, Hammarby  – 2012, 2015–2018
Maudo Jarjué – Elfsborg – 2021–
Aziz Corr Nyang – Djurgården – 2002–2004
Njogu Demba-Nyrén – Häcken – 2000–2001
Omar Jawo – Gefle, Syrianska – 2009–2012
Demba Savage – Häcken – 2016–
Noah Sonko Sundberg – AIK, GIF Sundsvall, Östersund – 2014–2021
Alagie Sosseh – Hammarby – 2007–2008
Pa Dembo Touray – Djurgården – 2004–2011
Bubacarr Trawally – Hammarby – 2022–

Georgia
Soso Chedia – GIF Sundsvall – 1991
Giorgi Kharaishvili – IFK Göteborg – 2018–2020
Kakhaber Tskhadadze – GIF Sundsvall – 1991
Zurab Tsiskaridze – AFC Eskilstuna – 2017

Germany

Dieter Burdenski – AIK – 1988
Christian Demirtaş – Syrianska – 2012–2013
Lukas Grill – Mjällby – 2014
Michael Görlitz – Halmstad – 2008–2011
Jan Tauer – Djurgården – 2007–2009
Volker Tönsfeldt – Djurgården – 1980–1981

Ghana

Zakaria Abdullai – Gefle – 2011–2013
Malik Abubakari – Malmö FF – 2021–
Mohammed Abubakari – Åtvidaberg, Häcken Helsingborg – 2012–2017, 2019–2020
David Accam – Helsingborg, Hammarby – 2012–2014, 2021
Joachim Acheampong – Norrköping – 1994–1995
Benjamin Acquah – Helsingborg – 2022–
Abdul-Basit Adam – Gefle – 2016
Nathaniel Adjei – Hammarby – 2022–
Enoch Kofi Adu – Malmö FF, AIK, Mjällby – 2014–2016, 2018–
Joachim Adukor – Gefle – 2012–2013
Joseph Aidoo – Hammarby – 2015–2017
Daniel Amartey – Djurgården – 2013–2014
Joseph Amoako – Helsingborg – 2022–
Michael Anaba – AFC Eskilstuna – 2019
Frank Arhin – Östersund – 2017–2018, 2020–2021
Ibrahim Atiku – Assyriska – 2005
Reuben Ayarna – GAIS – 2009–2012
Michael Baidoo – Elfsborg – 2022–
Thomas Boakye – Halmstad – 2021
Derek Boateng – AIK – 2003–2004, 2006
Ema Boateng – Helsingborg – 2013–2015
Emmanuel Boateng – Elfsborg – 2021–
Kwame Bonsu – Mjällby, Gefle – 2014–2016
Yussif Chibsah – Gefle, Djurgården – 2008–2014
Afo Dodoo – Landskrona – 2002–2003
Emmanuel Dogbe – Åtvidaberg – 2013–2014
Godsway Donyoh – Djurgården, Falkenberg – 2013–2015
Benjamin Fadi – Malmö FF – 2013
Emmanuel Frimpong – AFC Eskilstuna – 2017
King Gyan – Halmstad – 2014–2015
Abdul Halik Hudu – Hammarby – 2021
Kwame Karikari – AIK, Halmstad – 2011–2015
Sadat Karim – Halmstad – 2021
Prosper Kasim – IFK Göteborg – 2016
Richard Kingson – Hammarby – 2007
Kwame Kizito – Häcken, Falkenberg – 2019–2020
Gershon Koffie – Hammarby – 2017–2018
Patrick Kpozo – AIK, Östersund – 2016–2018, 2021
Enock Kwakwa – Falkenberg – 2015–2016
Abdul Majeed Waris – Häcken – 2010–2012
Gideon Mensah – Varberg – 2020–
Michael Mensah – Trelleborg – 2007–2008
Richard Oteng Mensah – Malmö FF – 2001
Baba Mensah – Häcken – 2016
Samuel Mensiro – Örebro, Östersund – 2014–2021
Issa Mohammed – Norrköping – 2002
Nasiru Mohammed – Häcken – 2012–2019, 2021
Ibrahim Moro – AIK – 2012–2014
Nasiru Moro – Örebro – 2021
Divine Naah – Örebro – 2017
Ebenezer Ofori – AIK – 2013–2016, 2020–2021
Lord Ofosuhene – Falkenberg – 2016
Mike Owusu – Malmö, Örgryte, Trelleborg – 1997–2001, 2004–2005
Yaw Preko – Halmstad – 2004–2005
Kwame Quansah – AIK – 2003–2004
Shamo Quaye – Umeå – 1996
Lawson Sabah – IFK Göteborg – 2016–2017
Ibrahim Sadiq – Häcken – 2022–
Charles Sampson – Assyriska – 2005
Kingsley Sarfo – Sirius, Malmö FF – 2017
Emmanuel Tetteh – IFK Göteborg – 1997–1999

Greece
Giannis Anestis – IFK Göteborg – 2019–2021
Vasilios Martidis – Kalmar – 1982, 1984–1985

Guinea
Ousmane Camara – AFC Eskilstuna – 2019
Amadou Doumbouya – Djurgården – 2022–
Mikael Dyrestam – IFK Göteborg, Kalmar – 2009–2013, 2017–2018
Amadou Kalabane – AFC Eskilstuna – 2017
Aly Keita – Östersund – 2016–2021
Pa Konate – Malmö FF, GIF Sundsvall – 2013–2017, 2019

Guinea-Bissau
Adelino Lopes – Assyriska – 2005
José Monteiro – Hammarby – 2006–2009

Haiti
Ronaldo Damus – GIF Sundsvall – 2022–

Honduras
Kevin Álvarez – Norrköping – 2019–2021

Hungary
Balázs Rabóczki – Norrköping – 2002
Gábor Szántó – Elfsborg – 1987

Iceland

Kári Árnason – Djurgården, Malmö FF – 2005–2006, 2015–2016
Guðjón Baldvinsson – GAIS, Halmstad – 2009, 2013–2014
Adam Ingi Benediktsson – IFK Göteborg – 2021–
Ísak Bergmann Jóhannesson – Norrköping – 2019–2021
Hlynur Birgison – Örebro – 1995–1998
Andri Rúnar Bjarnason – Helsingborg – 2019
Aron Bjarnason – Sirius – 2021–
Jóhannes Kristinn Bjarnason – Norrköping – 2021–
Ólafur Örn Bjarnason – Malmö FF – 1998–1999
Teddy Bjarnason – IFK Göteborg – 2009–2012
Halldór Orri Björnsson – Falkenberg – 2014
Hilmar Björnsson – Helsingborg – 1998–1999
Helgi Daníelsson – Öster, Elfsborg, AIK – 2006, 2008–2013
Alfreð Finnbogason – Helsingborg – 2010
Kristján Flóki Finnbogason – Brommapojkarna – 2018
Jón Guðni Fjóluson – Sundsvall, Norrköping, Hammarby – 2012, 2015–2018, 2021–
Skúli Jón Friðgeirsson – Elfsborg, Gefle – 2012–2014
Valgeir Lunddal Friðriksson – Häcken – 2021–
Gunnar Gíslason – Häcken – 1993
Andri Guðjohnsen – Norrköping – 2022–
Arnór Guðjohnsen – Häcken, Örebro – 1993–1998
Sveinn Aron Guðjohnsen – Elfsborg – 2021–
Eggert Guðmundsson – Halmstad – 1982–1986
Jóhann Guðmundsson – Örgryte, GAIS – 2004–2008
Tryggvi Guðmundsson – Örgryte – 2004
Brynjar Gunnarsson – Örgryte – 1999
Guðmundur Reynir Gunnarsson – GAIS – 2009
Garðar Gunnlaugsson – Norrköping – 2008
Höskuldur Gunnlaugsson – Halmstad – 2017
Daníel Hafsteinsson – Helsingborg – 2019
Emil Hallfreðsson – Malmö FF – 2006
Tryggvi Hrafn Haraldsson – Halmstad – 2017
Haukur Heiðar Hauksson – AIK – 2015–2018
Eyjólfur Héðinsson – GAIS – 2007–2011
Auðun Helgason – Landskrona – 2003–2004
Hjörtur Hermannsson – IFK Göteborg – 2016
Hördur Hilmarsson – AIK – 1981
Sigurbjörn Hreidarsson – Trelleborg – 2000
Haraldur Ingólfsson – Elfsborg – 1998–2000
Hallgrímur Jónasson – GAIS – 2009–2011
Jakob Jonhardsson – Helsingborg – 1998
Gunnlaugur Jónsson – Örebro – 1998
Hjálmar Jónsson – IFK Göteborg – 2002–2016
Kristinn Jónsson – Brommapojkarna – 2014 
Kristján Jónsson – Elfsborg – 1997
Pétur Björn Jónsson – Hammarby – 1998
Sigurður Jónsson – Örebro – 1996–1997
Óttar Magnús Karlsson – Trelleborg – 2018
Viðar Örn Kjartansson – Malmö FF, Hammarby – 2016, 2019
Birkir Kristinsson – Norrköping – 1998
Rúnar Kristinsson – Örgryte – 1995–1997
Ögmundur Kristinsson – Hammarby – 2015–2017
Guðjón Pétur Lýðsson – Helsingborg – 2011
Pétur Marteinsson – Hammarby – 1998, 2003–2006
Guðmundur Mete – Malmö FF – 2002
Davíð Kristján Ólafsson – Kalmar – 2022–
Thorsteinn Olafsson – IFK Göteborg – 1980
Elías Már Ómarsson – IFK Göteborg – 2016–2018
Óli Ómarsson – Sirius – 2022–
Örn Oskarsson – Örgryte – 1980–1981
Sölvi Ottesen – Djurgården – 2004–2008
Victor Pálsson – Helsingborg – 2014–2015
Einar Pall Tomasson – Degerfors – 1993
Alfons Sampsted – Norrköping – 2017
Birkir Már Sævarsson – Hammarby – 2015–2017
Jónas Guðni Sævarsson – Halmstad – 2009–2011
Eiður Sigurbjörnsson – Örebro – 2011, 2015
Þorvaldur Makan Sigbjörnsson – Öster – 1998
Kolbeinn Sigþórsson – AIK, IFK Göteborg – 2019–2021
Arnór Sigurðsson – Norrköping – 2017–2018, 2022–
Hannes Sigurðsson – Sundsvall, Mjällby  – 2008, 2013
Kristinn Freyr Sigurðsson – Sundsvall – 2017
Ragnar Sigurðsson – IFK Göteborg – 2007–2011
Kristofer Sigurgeirsson – V. Frölunda – 1995
Rúnar Már Sigurjónsson – Sundsvall – 2015–2016
Ari Freyr Skúlason – Häcken, GIF Sundsvall, Norrköping – 2006, 2008, 2012, 2021–
Ólafur Ingi Skúlason – Helsingborg – 2007–2009
Arnór Smárason – Helsingborg, Hammarby – 2013–2014, 2016–2018
Árni Stefánsson – Landskrona – 1980
Hlynur Stefansson – Örebro – 1992–1995
Kristinn Steindórsson – Halmstad, Sundsvall – 2013–2014, 2016–2017
Gudmundur Steinsson – Öster – 1982
Oskar Sverrisson – Häcken, Varberg – 2019–
Sverrir Sverrisson – Malmö FF – 1998–1999
Atli Sveinn Þórarinsson – Örgryte – 2000–2004
Guðmundur Þórarinsson – Norrköping – 2017–2019
Stefán Þórðarson – Öster – 1997–1998
Teitur Þórðarson – Öster – 1978–1981, 1985–1986
Þórður Þórðarson – Norrköping – 1999
Guðmann Þórisson – Mjällby – 2014
Gunnar Heiðar Þorvaldsson – Halmstad, Norrköping, Häcken – 2004–2006, 2011–2015
Arnór Ingvi Traustason – Norrköping, Malmö FF – 2014–2016, 2018–2020, 2022–
Hákon Rafn Valdimarsson – Elfsborg – 2021–
Hjörtur Logi Valgarðsson – IFK Göteborg, Örebro  – 2011–2013, 2015–
Árni Vilhjálmsson – Jönköping – 2017

Italy 
Gianluca Curci – AFC Eskilstuna, Hammarby – 2018–2019

Iran
Omid Nazari – Malmö FF – 2011
Saman Ghoddos – Östersund – 2016–2018
Alireza Haghighi – AFC Eskilstuna – 2017

Iraq
Amir Al-Ammari – Halmstad, IFK Göteborg, Mjällby – 2021–
Amin Al-Hamawi – Helsingborg – 2022–
Alai Ghasem – IFK Göteborg – 2022–
Ghassan Heamed – Assyriska – 2005
Jiloan Hamad – Malmö FF, Hammarby, Örebro – 2008–2013, 2017–2018, 2021
Mohanad Jeahze – Brommapojkarna, Mjällby, Hammarby – 2018, 2020–2022
Yaser Kasim – Örebro – 2019
Amar Muhsin – Helsingborg – 2022–
Brwa Nouri – Östersund – 2016–2018
Ahmed Yasin – Örebro, AIK, Häcken, Örebro – 2011–2012, 2014–2021

Ireland
Zachary Elbouzedi – AIK – 2021–
Anto Flood – Örebro – 2010
Patrick Walker – Häcken, GIF Sundsvall – 1983, 1987–1989

Israel
Yahav Gurfinkel – Norrköping – 2021

Ivory Coast
Salaou Abundance – IFK Göteborg – 2022–
Yannick Adjoumani – Häcken – 2021–
Adama Fofana – Varberg – 2020–2021
Aboubakar Keita – Halmstad – 2017
Raoul Kouakou – Malmö FF – 2005–2006
Odilon Kossounou – Hammarby – 2019
Bayéré Junior Loué – Hammarby – 2021–
Kalpi Ouattara – Östersund – 2019–2021
Aziz Ouattara Mohammed – Hammarby – 2021
Abdul Razak – IFK Göteborg, AFC Eskilstuna, Sirius – 2017–2019
Amane Romeo – Häcken – 2022–

Jamaica
Teafore Bennett – Öster – 2006
Dwayne Miller – Syrianska – 2011–2013
Ravel Morrison – Östersund – 2019
Michael Seaton – Örebro – 2015
Luton Shelton – Helsingborg – 2006–2007
Khari Stephenson – GAIS, AIK – 2006–2008
Blair Turgott – Östersund, Häcken – 2019–

Japan
Kosuke Kinoshita – Halmstad – 2017
Yukiya Sugita – Dalkurd, Sirius – 2018, 2020–
Soya Takahashi – AFC Eskilstuna – 2019

Jordan
Jonathan Tamimi – Jönköping, GIF Sundsvall, Mjällby, Degerfors – 2016–2021

Kazakhstan
David Loria – Halmstad – 2007

Kenya

Henry Atola – AIK – 2022–
Sichenje Collins – AIK – 2022–
Robert Mambo Mumba – Örebro, Häcken, GIF Sundsvall – 2004, 2006, 2008
McDonald Mariga – Helsingborg – 2006–2008
Bonaventure Maruti – Örebro – 2001–2003
David Ochieng – Brommapojkarna – 2018
Joseph Okumu – Elfsborg – 2019–2021
Michael Olunga – Djurgården – 2016
Eric Johana Omondi – Brommapojkarna – 2018
Patrick Osiako – Mjällby – 2010–2011
Eric Ouma – AIK – 2020–
Paul Oyuga – Örebro – 2001–2003

Kosovo
Bajram Ajeti – Brommapojkarna – 2018
Fidan Aliti – Kalmar – 2019–2020
Ilir Berisha – Örebro, Gefle – 2012, 2014–2015
Ibrahim Drešević – Elfsborg – 2016–2018
Erton Fejzullahu – Mjällby, Djurgården, Kalmar – 2011–2014, 2017–2018
Ardian Gashi – Helsingborg – 2010–2014
Jetmir Haliti – AIK, Mjällby – 2021–
Shpëtim Hasani – Kalmar, Norrköping, Örebro, GIF Sundsvall – 2006, 2011–2012, 2014–2016
Edvin Kurtulus – Halmstad, Hammarby – 2021–
Ismet Lushaku – AFC Eskilstuna, Varberg – 2019, 2022–
Kushtrim Lushtaku – Örebro – 2011–2012
Leonard Pllana – Dalkurd – 2018
Anel Raskaj – Halmstad, AFC Eskilstuna – 2007–2011, 2017, 2019
Dardan Rexhepi – Malmö FF, Brommapojkarna, Häcken – 2010–2016
Erion Sadiku – Varberg – 2020
Loret Sadiku – Helsingborg, Hammarby – 2012–2014, 2022–
Patriot Sejdiu – Malmö FF – 2022–
Astrit Selmani – Varberg, Hammarby – 2020–2022
Edi Sylisufaj – Falkenberg, Sirius – 2016, 2019–

Latvia
Kaspars Gorkšs – Öster, Assyriska – 2003, 2005
Valerij Ivanov – Helsingborg – 1993–1994
Andrej Linards – Örebro – 1992–1993
Andrejs Rubins – Öster – 1997

Lebanon
Mohammed Ali Khan – Häcken, Halmstad  – 2009–2013, 2015
Abbas Hassan – Elfsborg, Norrköping – 2005, 2007, 2011–2016
Felix Michel Melki – Syrianska, AFC Eskilstuna, AIK – 2013, 2019–2020
Mohamed Ramadan – Helsingborg – 2011, 2015

Liberia
Jimmy Dixon – Häcken, Malmö FF – 2005–2009, 2012
Dulee Johnson – Häcken, AIK – 2001–2010
Sam Johnson – Djurgården, Mjällby AIF – 2015–2016, 2021
Amadaiya Rennie – Elfsborg, GAIS, Hammarby – 2010–2011, 2015–2016
Justin Salmon – Degerfors – 2021–
Dioh Williams – Häcken, Gefle – 2005–2006, 2011–2016
Peter Wilson – GIF Sundsvall – 2015–2019

Lithuania

Vytautas Andriuškevičius – Djurgården – 2013–2014
Tomas Ražanauskas – Malmö FF, Trelleborg – 1999, 2004
Donatas Vencevičius – GIF Sundsvall – 2005
Tomas Žvirgždauskas – Halmstad – 2002–2011

Luxembourg
Lars Krogh Gerson – Norrköping, GIF Sundsvall – 2012–2020
Vincent Thill – AIK – 2022–

Malawi
Russell Mwafulirwa – Norrköping – 2008, 2011

Mali
Ismael Diawara – Degerfors, Malmö FF – 2021–
Mamadou Kouyaté – AFC Eskilstuna – 2019
Adama Tamboura – Helsingborg – 2006–2009

Moldova
Igor Armaş – Hammarby – 2009
Petru Racu – Norrköping – 2008, 2011

Montenegro

Dragoljub Brnović – Örgryte – 1993
Dragan Đukanović – Örebro – 1997–1998
Žarko Dragaš – Degerfors – 1996
Sead Hakšabanović – Halmstad, Norrköping, Djurgården – 2015, 2017, 2019–2022
Dino Islamović – Östersund – 2018–2019
Slobodan Marović – Norrköping – 1992–1994
Duško Radinović – Degerfors – 1993–1997
Miodrag Radulović – Degerfors – 1996–1997
Vladimir Rodić – Malmö FF, Hammarby – 2015–2016, 2018–2021
Aleksandar Vlahović – Hammarby – 1994
Milenko Vukčević – Degerfors – 1993–1997

Montserrat
Alex Dyer – Östersund, Elfsborg – 2016–2019

Morocco
Driss El-Asmar – Malmö FF, Enköping – 2002–2003
Moestafa El Kabir – Mjällby, Häcken, Kalmar – 2010–2014, 2018–2019
Karim Fegrouche – Sirius – 2018
Yazid Kaïssi – Häcken – 2005–2006

Netherlands

Rewan Amin – Dalkurd, Östersund – 2018–2020
Othman El Kabir – Djurgården – 2016–2017
Michiel Hemmen – Häcken – 2015
Jos Hooiveld – AIK – 2009, 2015–2016
Rick Kruys – Malmö FF – 2008–2010
Des Kunst – Varberg – 2021–
Stefan van der Lei – Dalkurd – 2018
Sander van Looy – Falkenberg – 2020
Geert den Ouden – Djurgården – 2003–2004
Melvin Platje – Kalmar – 2014
Alexander Prent – Halmstad – 2009–2010
Frank Schinkels – Halmstad – 1981–1982
Niels Vorthoren – Häcken – 2015–2016

New Zealand
Francis de Vries – Värnamo – 2022–
Matthew Garbett – Falkenberg – 2020
Craig Henderson – Mjällby – 2011–2013
Dan Keat – Falkenberg – 2014–2015

Nigeria

Yusuff Abdulazeez – Mjällby – 2022–
Suleiman Abdullahi – IFK Göteborg – 2022–
Mohammed Abdulrahman – GAIS – 2011
Ishaq Abdulrazak – Norrköping – 2020–2022
Michael Adeyinka – GIF Sundsvall – 2005
Samuel Adegbenro – Norrköping – 2021
Chima Akas – Kalmar – 2018–2019
Yakubu Alfa – Helsingborg – 2009
Akinkunmi Amoo – Hammarby – 2020–2021
Kevin Amuneke – Landskrona, Norrköping – 2004–2006, 2008
Kingsley Amuneke – Landskrona – 2004–2006
Gbenga Arokoyo – Mjällby, Kalmar – 2012–2014, 2018, 2020
Jordan Attah Kadiri – Östersund – 2019–2020
Samuel Ayorinde – AIK – 2002–2003
Isaac Boye – Örebro – 2018, 2020
Dominic Chatto – Häcken – 2009–2013
John Chibuike – Häcken, AIK, Falkenberg – 2009–2011, 2016, 2019–2020
Justice Christopher – Trelleborg – 2004
Abiola Dauda – Kalmar – 2008–2012
Chisom Egbuchulam – Häcken – 2017
Prince Eboagwu – Åtvidaberg – 2008–2012
Prince Ikpe Ekong – GAIS, Djurgården – 2006–2011
Godswill  Ekpolo – Häcken, Norrköping – 2018–
Obie Etie – Syrianska – 2011
Dickson Etuhu – AIK – 2015–2016
Richard Friday – Örebro – 2021
Bala Garba – GIF Sundsvall – 2003
Haruna Garba – Djurgården – 2017
Alhaji Gero – Öster, Östersund, Helsingborg – 2013, 2016–2020
John Junior Igbarumah – Sirius – 2019
Kennedy Igboananike – Djurgården, AIK, Örebro, Sirius – 2007, 2010–2014, 2017–2018, 2020
Peter Ijeh – Malmö FF, IFK Göteborg, Syrianska, GAIS – 2001–2005, 2011–2012
Bonke Innocent – Malmö FF – 2017–2021
Monday James – Hammarby – 2009
Pascal Kondaponi – Ljungskile – 2008
Garba Lawal – Elfsborg – 2004
Samuel Nnamani – AFC Eskilstuna – 2019
Silas Nwankwo – Mjällby – 2022–
Chinedu Obasi – AIK, IF Elfsborg – 2016–2019
Mike Obiku – Helsingborg – 1994
Edward Ofere – Malmö FF – 2005–2010
Henry Offia – Sirius – 2018–2019
Moses Ogbu – Jönköping, Sirius, Mjällby – 2016–2018, 2020
Chidi Omeje – AFC Eskilstuna, GIF Sundsvall – 2017–2019
Michael Omoh – Östersund, Örebro – 2016–2019
John Owoeri – Åtvidaberg, Häcken – 2012–2016
Nsima Peter – Falkenberg – 2019–2020
Saidu Salisu – IFK Göteborg – 2022–
Monday Samuel – Östersund, Helsingborg, Varberg – 2016, 2020
Taye Taiwo – AFC Eskilstuna – 2017
Franklin Tebo – Häcken – 2021–
Akombo Ukeyima – GIF Sundsvall − 2008
Alhassan Yusuf – IFK Göteborg – 2018–2021

Macedonia

Armend Alimi – Örebro – 2011
Daniel Ivanovski – Mjällby – 2010–2014
Zoran Jovanovski – Helsingborg – 1997–1999
Nikica Klinčarski – V. Frölunda – 1989
Daniel Krezic – Varberg, Degerfors – 2020–
David Mitov Nilsson – Norrköping, GIF Sundsvall, Sirius – 2012–2017, 2019, 2021–
Nuri Mustafi – GIF Sundsvall – 2008, 2012
Erdal Rakip – Malmö FF – 2013–2017, 2019–
Artim Šakiri – Halmstad – 1997–1998
Jurica Siljanoski – Elfsborg – 2001–2003
Baskim Sopi – Enköping – 2003
Vujadin Stanojković – Degerfors, Trelleborg – 1993–1998
Kire Sterjov – V. Frölunda – 2000
Filip Trpchevski – Häcken – 2022–
Leonard Zuta – Häcken – 2012–2015, 2020

Northern Ireland
Colin Hill – Trelleborg – 1997
David McCreery – GIF Sundsvall – 1989
Sammy McIlroy – Örgryte – 1986
Daryl Smylie – Ljungskile, Kalmar, Jönköping – 2008–2010, 2016–2017

Norway

Stian Aasmundsen – Jönköping – 2016–2017
Oscar Aga – Elfsborg – 2022–
Haitam Aleesami – IFK Göteborg – 2015–2016
Ståle Andersen – Örgryte – 1997–1998
Vetle Andersen – Halmstad – 1991–1993
Lars Bakkerud – Helsingborg – 2002–2003
Oliver Berg – Dalkurd, GIF Sundsvall, Kalmar – 2018–2019, 2021–
Tommy Bergersen – GIF Sundsvall – 2002–2005
Jo Inge Berget – Malmö FF – 2015–2017, 2019–
Trym Bergman – Hammarby – 2000–2002
Veton Berisha – Hammarby – 2022–
Daniel Berntsen – Djurgården – 2015–2016
Henrik Bjørdal – IFK Göteborg – 2017
Per Kristian Bråtveit – Djurgården – 2019–2020
Christian Brink – GIF Sundsvall – 2012
Fredrik Brustad – AIK – 2015–2016
Leo Cornic – Djurgården – 2021–2022
Lars Cramer – Kalmar – 2013–2015
Thomas Drage – Falkenberg – 2016
Mathias Dyngeland – Elfsborg – 2020
Daniel Eid – Norrköping – 2022–
Magnus Wolff Eikrem – Malmö FF – 2015–2017
Tarik Elyounoussi – AIK – 2018–2019
Arne Erlandsen – Djurgården – 1981
Dinko Felić – Syrianska – 2011–2013
Karl Oskar Fjørtoft – Hammarby – 2003–2004
Aslak Fonn Witry – Djurgården – 2019–2021
Lars Fuhre – Hammarby – 2015
Petter Furuseth Olsen – Örebro, Hammarby – 2004–2006
Øyvind Gram – Gefle – 2010
Daniel Granli – AIK – 2019–2020
Mathias Gravem – Ljungskile, Norrköping, GAIS – 1998–2001, 2006
Stian Rode Gregersen – Elfsborg – 2019
Niklas Gunnarsson – Elfsborg, Djurgården  – 2015–2018
Erlend Hanstveit – Helsingborg – 2011–2013 
Eirik Haugan – Östersund – 2019–2021
Henning Hauger – Elfsborg – 2013–2016
Tobias Heintz – Häcken – 2021
Asbjørn Helgeland – Örebro – 1999–2000
Sivert Heltne Nilsen – Elfsborg – 2019–2020
Geir André Herrem – Kalmar – 2019–2020
Bjørnar Holmvik – Kalmar – 2013
Jørgen Horn – Elfsborg – 2016–2018
Tor Øyvind Hovda – Kalmar, Åtvidaberg – 2014–2015
Even Hovland – Häcken – 2022–
Per Mathias Høgmo – Norrköping – 1986
Kenneth Høie – Elfsborg, Djurgården – 2012–2016
Jon Inge Høiland – IFK Göteborg, Malmö FF – 1999–2007
Bernt Hulsker – AIK – 2006–2007
Mikael Ingebrigtsen – IFK Göteborg – 2018
Kenneth Jensen – Häcken – 1994
Stig Johansen – Helsingborg – 1998–2000
Bjørn Johansen – Helsingborg – 2000–2001
Christian Johnsen – Örebro – 2004
Joackim Jørgensen – Elfsborg – 2012–2013
Pa Modou Kah – AIK – 2003–2004
Aram Khalili – GAIS – 2010
Thomas Kind Bendiksen – Elfsborg – 2016
Mike Kjølø – AIK – 1998–1999
Julian Kristoffersen – Djurgården  – 2017
Snorre Krogsgård – Halmstad – 2015
Lars Larsen – Häcken – 2022–
André Schei Lindbæk – Landskrona – 2004–2005
Odd Lindberg – Örebro, IFK Göteborg – 1976–1979
Eman Markovic – Norrköping, IFK Göteborg – 2022–
Per Edmund Mordt – IFK Göteborg – 1986–1990, 1992
Erik Nevland – IFK Göteborg – 1999
Fredrik Oldrup Jensen – IFK Göteborg – 2018
Benny Olsen – Enköping – 2003
Thor André Olsen – Djurgården, Norrköping – 1995–1996, 1999
Kjetil Osvold – Djurgården – 1988
Kjetil Ruthford Pedersen – Elfsborg – 1998–2000
Steinar Pedersen – IFK Göteborg – 1999–2001
Tore Pedersen – IFK Göteborg – 1990–1992
Roger Risholt – Häcken, GIF Sundsvall – 2006, 2012
Glenn Roberts – Åtvidaberg – 2010
Thomas Rogne – IFK Göteborg, Helsingborg – 2015–2017, 2022–
Alexander Ruud Tveter – Halmstad – 2017
Per Verner Rønning – AIK – 2007
Lars Sætra – Hammarby, Kalmar – 2015–2016, 2021–
Vajebah Sakor – IFK Göteborg – 2017–2018
Harmeet Singh – Kalmar – 2017
Edvard Skagestad – Norrköping – 2014
Bent Skammelsrud – Malmö FF – 1990
Morten Skjønsberg – Norrköping – 2012–2014
Alexander Søderlund – Häcken – 2020
Mats Solheim – Kalmar, Hammarby – 2012–2019
Jan Gunnar Solli – Hammarby – 2015
Petter Solli – Trelleborg – 1998–1999
Thomas Sørum – Helsingborg – 2011–2012
Tom Kåre Staurvik – GIF Sundsvall – 2002–2003
Arild Stavrum – Helsingborg – 1998–1999
Lasse Staw – Syrianska – 2012
Kenneth Storvik – Helsingborg – 1997–1999
Steinar Strømnes – Åtvidaberg – 2010
Sander Svendsen – Hammarby – 2017–2018
Øyvind Svenning – GIF Sundsvall – 2002–2005
Fredrik Torsteinbø – Hammarby – 2015
Tomas Totland – Häcken – 2022–
Erik Thorstvedt – IFK Göteborg – 1988
Fredrik Ulvestad – Djurgården – 2018–2020
Andreas Vindheim – Malmö FF – 2015–2019
Gustav Wikheim – Djurgården – 2022–
Fredrik Winsnes – Hammarby – 2002
Kjetil Wæhler – IFK Göteborg – 2012–2014

Palestine
Ahmed Awad – Dalkurd, Östersund – 2018, 2020–2021
Mahmoud Eid – Kalmar – 2016–2017, 2019
Imad Zatara – Brommapojkarna, Syrianska, Åtvidaberg – 2007, 2011–2014

Panama
Brunet Hay – Örebro – 2011

Paraguay
Antonio Rojas – Halmstad – 2013–2015

Peru
Sergio Peña – Malmö FF – 2021–
Yoshimar Yotún – Malmö FF – 2015–2017

Philippines
Jesper Nyholm – AIK, Djurgården – 2017, 2020–2021

Poland

Dawid Banaczek – Norrköping – 2001–2002
Marcin Burkhardt – Norrköping – 2008
Ryszard Jankowski – Trelleborg – 1992–1995
Miroslaw Kubisztal – Örebro – 1991–1997
Mikołaj Lebedyński – Häcken – 2013
Krzysztof Pawlak – Trelleborg – 1992
Piotr Piekarczyk – GAIS – 1990–1991
Piotr Skrobowski – Hammarby – 1990
Marek Skurczynski – Trelleborg – 1985
Michał Sławuta – Ljungskile – 2008
Tomasz Stolpa – Gefle – 2007
Igor Sypniewski – Halmstad, Malmö FF, Trelleborg – 2003–2004
Krystian Szuster – Halmstad – 1990
Andrzej Woronko – Mjällby – 1983, 1985

Portugal
Gabriel Castro – GIF Sundsvall – 2022–
Yago Fernández – Malmö FF – 2010–2011
Rúben Lameiras – Åtvidaberg – 2015
Paulino Lopes Tavares – Trelleborg – 2008–2009
Filipe Sisse – Varberg – 2022–

Romania
Stefan Szilagyi – Ljungskile – 1997

Russia

Sergey Andreyev – Öster – 1990
Vladislav Bragin – AFC Eskilstuna – 2019
Aleksandr Gitselov – Öster – 1992–1993
Yevgeny Kharlitov – Norrköping – 1997
Yevgeni Kobozev – Jönköping – 2017
Yevgeni Kuznetsov – Norrköping, Öster – 1990–1993, 1997
Andrey Lebedev – Brage – 1993
Kirill Pogrebnyak – Falkenberg – 2019
Sergey Prigoda – Öster – 1990
Sandro Tsveiba – AFC Eskilstuna – 2019
Aleksandr Vasyutin – Djurgården – 2021–2022

Rwanda
Bobo Bola – Landskrona – 2005
Olivier Karekezi – Helsingborg – 2005–2007

Scotland

Stuart Baxter – Landskrona – 1980
Billy Davies – Elfsborg – 1986–1987
Stuart McManus – Örgryte – 1988–1990
Malcolm McPherson – Norrköping – 1996
Paul Maguire – Brage – 1984
Andy Roddie – Ljungskile – 1997

Senegal
Aliou Badji – Djurgården – 2017–2018
Mamadou Diallo – IFK Göteborg – 2003
Papa Alioune Diouf – Kalmar – 2012–2019, 2022–
Malick Mané – IFK Göteborg – 2014

Serbia

Veljko Birmančević – Malmö FF – 2021–2022
Zoran Bulatović – GAIS – 1992
Slaviša Čula – Örgryte – 1989
Nenad Đorđević – Kalmar – 2012–2015
Nikola Đurđić – Helsingborg, Malmö FF, Hammarby, Degerfors  – 2012, 2015, 2018–2019, 2021–
Dragan Drljača – Trelleborg – 1997
Frederick Enaholo – Trelleborg – 1995–1997
Nikola Gulan – Häcken – 2020
Ivan Isaković – Assyriska – 2005
Budimir Janošević – AIK – 2018–
Ivan Kričak – Mjällby – 2021–
Aleksandar Kristić – Degerfors – 1995
Milan Kuzeljević – V. Frölunda – 1994
Danilo Kuzmanović – Djurgården – 2010
Nenad Lukić – AIK – 2006
Nebojša Marinković – Djurgården – 2008
Dušan Milutinović – Degerfors – 1997
Ivica Momčilović – Trelleborg – 1998
Miljan Mutavdžić – Malmö FF – 2009–2011
Nikola Petrić – Brommapojkarna – 2018
Zoran Petrovic – Umeå – 1996
Bogić Popović – Hammarby – 2000
Aleksandar Prijović – Djurgården – 2013–2014
Petar Puača – Helsingborg – 1997
Bojan Radulović – AIK – 2020–2021
Milan Simeunović – Malmö FF – 1998–1999
Dragan Stevović – Ljungskile – 1997
Dragan Vasiljević – Hammarby – 2000

Sierra Leone

Mahmadu Alphajor Bah – Halmstad – 2005
Gbassay Bangura – Degerfors, Elfsborg – 1997–1998
Mohamed Bangura – AIK, Elfsborg – 2010–2013, 2015
Teteh Bangura – AIK – 2011
Samuel Barlay – Malmö FF – 2005
Aluspah Brewah – Hammarby – 2004
Mohamed Buya Turay – AFC Eskilstuna, Dalkurd, Djurgården, Malmö FF – 2017–2019, 2022–
Mohamed Kabia – Syrianska – 2012
Kemokai Kallon – Ljungskile – 1997
Alhaji Kamara – Djurgården, Norrköping  – 2012, 2014–2015
Alhassan Kamara – AIK, Örebro, Häcken – 2011–2018
Alusine Kamara – Syrianska – 2011
Brima Koroma – Enköping, Kalmar – 2003, 2005–2006
Ibrahim Koroma – Trelleborg – 2010–2011
Christian Moses – Värnamo – 2022–
John Sama – Degerfors – 1997
Kabba Samura – IFK Göteborg, Assyriska – 2001–2003, 2005
Sheriff Suma – GAIS – 2007–2008
Kevin Wright – Örebro, Sirius – 2019–2022

Slovakia
Juraj Dovičovič – Djurgården – 2004
Marek Hamšík – IFK Göteborg – 2021
Michal Kubala – Ljungskile – 2008

Slovenia

Peter Binkovski – Öster – 1996
Miran Burgič – AIK – 2006–2010
Dejan Jurkič – Örgryte – 2005–2006
Andrej Komac – Djurgården – 2006–2009
Aljoša Matko – Hammarby – 2021
Ermin Šiljak – Hammarby – 2001
Ante Šimundža – Malmö FF – 1998

South Africa

Stephen Armstrong – V. Frölunda – 2000
Keanin Ayer – Varberg – 2020–2021
Lance Davids – Djurgården – 2006–2008
Nathan Gibson – Norrköping – 1997
Luke Le Roux – Varberg – 2020–
May Mahlangu – Helsingborg, IFK Göteborg – 2009–2014
Tefu Mashamaite – Häcken – 2015–2016
Tashreeq Matthews – Helsingborg, Varberg – 2019–
Mark Mayambela – Djurgården – 2014
Mihlali Mayambela – Djurgården – 2016
Thando Mngomeni – Helsingborg – 2004–2005
Ryan Moon – Varberg – 2021
Toni Nhleko – Hammarby – 2006–2007
Ayanda Nkili – Örebro – 2014–2015
Siyabonga Nomvethe – Djurgården – 2005
Nathan Paulse – Hammarby – 2008–2009
Sive Pekezela – Gefle – 2013–2014
Amethyst Bradley Ralani – Helsingborg – 2016
Tokelo Rantie – Malmö FF – 2012–2013
Dean Solomons – Varberg – 2021

South Korea
Moon Seon-min – Djurgården – 2015–2016

Spain

David Batanero – GIF Sundsvall, Mjällby – 2017–2020
Cala – Jönköping – 2016–2017
Juanjo Ciércoles – GIF Sundsvall – 2018–2019
David Concha – Hammarby – 2022–
Samu de los Reyes – GIF Sundsvall – 2018
Iván Díaz – Halmstad – 2011
Marcos Gondra Krug – Syrianska – 2012
David Haro – GIF Sundsvall – 2018–2019
Javi Hernández – Halmstad – 2011
José León – AFC Eskilstuna – 2019
Francisco Marmolejo Mancilla – Jönköping – 2016–2017
Brian Martín – Östersund – 2020
Marc Mas – GIF Sundsvall – 2019
Pol Moreno – GIF Sundsvall – 2018–2019
Carlos Moros – GIF Sundsvall, Mjällby – 2017–2019, 2021–
Maikel Nieves – Brommapojkarna – 2018
Nauzet Pérez – Halmstad – 2011
Álex Portillo – Jönköping, Elfsborg – 2016–2017, 2019
Pol Roigé – GIF Sundsvall – 2019
Raúl Ruiz – Halmstad – 2011
Tati Alcalde – Landskrona – 1994
Francisco Verona – Brage – 1989
José Zamora – Halmstad – 2011

Suriname
Warner Hahn – IFK Göteborg – 2022
Shaquille Pinas – Hammarby – 2022–

Switzerland
Feliciano Magro – Landskrona, Djurgården, Norrköping – 2004–2008

Syria
Hosam Aiesh – Häcken, Östersund, IFK Göteborg – 2014, 2016–2022
Louay Chanko – Djurgården, Malmö FF, Hammarby, Syrianska – 2001–2009, 2012–2013
Imad Chhadeh – Brommapojkarna – 2007, 2009–2010
Elias Merkes – Assyriska – 2005
George Mourad – V. Frölunda, IFK Göteborg, Syrianska – 2000, 2004–2007, 2012

Tanzania
Haruna Moshi – Gefle – 2010
Kali Ongala – GIF Sundsvall – 2008

Togo
Lalawélé Atakora – AIK, Helsingborg – 2011–2016

Tunisia
Melke Amri – Hammarby – 1977
Samir Bakaou – V. Frölunda, GAIS – 1987–1990
Issam Jebali – Elfsborg – 2016–2018
Ali Youssef – Häcken – 2019–

Turkey
Abdülaziz Demircan – Dalkurd – 2018
Deniz Hümmet – Trelleborg, Elfsborg, Örebro – 2018–2021

Uganda
Lumala Abdu – Kalmar – 2016
Martin Kayongo-Mutumba – AIK – 2009–2014
Ronald Mukiibi – Häcken, Östersund, Degerfors – 2014, 2016–
Abubaker Tabula – GIF Sundsvall – 2008

Ukraine
Ivan Bobko – AFC Eskilstuna – 2019
Viktor Khlus – GAIS – 1989
Ihor Levchenko – AFC Eskilstuna – 2019
Vadym Yevtushenko – AIK – 1989–1993

United States

Gale Agbossoumonde – Djurgården – 2011
Alejandro Bedoya – Örebro – 2009–2011
Colin Burns -  Ljungskile - 2009
Joe Corona – GIF Sundsvall – 2022–
D. J. Countess – Öster – 2006
Charlie Davies – Hammarby – 2007–2009
Alex De John – Dalkurd – 2018
Mix Diskerud – IFK Göteborg, Helsingborg – 2017–2018, 2020
John Doyle – Örgryte – 1990
Jeffrey Gal – Degerfors – 2021–2022
Romain Gall – Sundsvall, Malmö FF, Örebro – 2017–2022
Joseph-Claude Gyau – Degerfors – 2022–
Brendan Hines-Ike – Örebro – 2016–2018
Aron Jóhannsson – Hammarby – 2019–2020
Forrest Lasso – GIF Sundsvall – 2022
Ryan Miller – Halmstad – 2010–2011
Hugo Pérez – Örgryte – 1990
Samuel Petrone – Mjällby – 2012
Thomas Philipps – GAIS – 1988
Matt Pyzdrowski – Helsingborg – 2015–2016
Ryan Raybould – Gefle – 2008
Kofi Sarkodie – Trelleborg – 2018
Johann Smith – Kalmar – 2010
Brian Span – Djurgården – 2012–2013
Andrew Stadler – Östersund, Dalkurd – 2016, 2018
McKinley Tennyson – GIF Sundsvall – 2001
Michael Thomas – Halmstad – 2010
Mark White – Hammarby – 1986
Josh Wicks – Sirius – 2017–2018

Uruguay
Jorge Anchén – AIK – 2008
Felipe Carvalho – Malmö FF, Falkenberg – 2015–2017
Sebastián Eguren – Hammarby, AIK – 2006–2008, 2010
Alejandro Lago – IFK Göteborg – 2006
Diego Lugano – Häcken – 2015

Zambia
Emmanuel Banda – Djurgården – 2020–2022
Isaac Chansa – Helsingborg – 2007–2009
Edward Chilufya – Djurgården – 2018–2021
Clifford Mulenga – Örgryte – 2005
Boyd Mwila – Örgryte, Djurgården – 2003–2006, 2009
Edwin Phiri – Örgryte, Ljungskile – 2003–2005, 2008
Dominic Yobe – Örgryte – 2004–2006

Zimbabwe

Kundai Benyu – Helsingborg – 2019
Archford Gutu – Kalmar – 2012–2013
Tino Kadewere – Djurgården – 2015–2018
Nyasha Mushekwi – Djurgården – 2015
Matthew Rusike – Halmstad, Helsingborg – 2015–2016

See also
List of Allsvenskan players
List of foreign Superettan players
List of foreign Damallsvenskan players

Notes

References

 
Sweden
 
Association football player non-biographical articles